Ismael Martínez (born 27 May 1956) is a Puerto Rican boxer. He competed in the men's light welterweight event at the 1976 Summer Olympics. At the 1976 Summer Olympics, he defeated Siergot Sully of Haiti before losing to Clinton McKenzie of Great Britain.

References

External links
 

1956 births
Living people
Puerto Rican male boxers
Olympic boxers of Puerto Rico
Boxers at the 1976 Summer Olympics
Place of birth missing (living people)
Light-welterweight boxers
20th-century Puerto Rican people